Cooke County is a county in the U.S. state of Texas. At the 2020 census, its population was 41,668. The county seat is Gainesville. The county was founded in 1848 and organized the next year. It is named for William Gordon Cooke, a soldier during the Texas Revolution. It is a part of the Texoma region.

Cooke County comprises the Gainesville, TX micropolitan statistical area, which is also included in the Dallas–Fort Worth, TX-OK combined statistical area.

Geography

Major highways
   Interstate 35/U.S. Highway 77
  U.S. Highway 82
  Farm to Market Road 51

Adjacent counties
 Love County, Oklahoma (north)
 Grayson County (east)
 Denton County (south)
 Wise County (southwest)
 Montague County (west)

Demographics

Note: the US Census treats Hispanic/Latino as an ethnic category. This table excludes Latinos from the racial categories and assigns them to a separate category. Hispanics/Latinos can be of any race.

According to statistical data from 2016, Cooke County has a population of 39,141 people (41% urban, 59% rural), nearly 14,000 households, and over 10,000 families. The population density was 42 per square mile (16/km2). The 15,061 housing units averaged 17 per square mile (7/km2). The racial makeup of the county was 88.84% White, 3.06% Black or African American, 1.00% Native American, 0.34% Asian, 0.01% Pacific Islander, 5.16% from other races, and 1.61% from two or more races.  About 10% of the population was Hispanic or Latino of any race.

Of the more than 14,000 households in Cooke County, 33.90% had children under the age of 18 living in the home, 59.60% were married couples living together, 9.90% had a female householder with no husband present, and 26.70% were not families; 23.30% of all households were made up of individuals, and 11.10% had someone living alone who was 65 years of age or older. The average household size was 2.60 and the average family size was 3.07.

The population was distributed as 27.30% under the age of 18, 8.70% from 18 to 24, 26.10% from 25 to 44, 23.00% from 45 to 64, and 14.90% who were 65 years of age or older. The median age was 37 years. For every 100 females, there were 97.40 males. For every 100 females age 18 and over, there were 92.80 males.

While 2015 estimates place the median household income for Cooke County at $53,552, past estimates showed the median household income to be $37,649, with the median family income being $44,869. Males had a median income of $32,429 and females $22,065. The per capita income was $17,889. About 10.90% of families and 14.10% of the population were below the poverty line, including 19.80% of those under age 18 and 10.70% of those age 65 or over. Median house values in 2015 were $118,254.

Government and infrastructure
The Texas Juvenile Justice Department operates the Gainesville State School in an unincorporated area in Cooke County, east of Gainesville.

Politics
Cooke County is heavily Republican. The last Democrat to win Cooke County was Lyndon B. Johnson in 1964.
Cooke County is included in the heavily Republican 13th Congressional District. Republicans have won over 75% of the vote in each of the past six presidential elections, starting in 2000.
Republican Drew Springer, Jr., a businessman from Muenster, has represented Cooke County in the Texas House of Representatives since January 2013.

Communities

Cities
 Callisburg
 Gainesville
 Lindsay
 Muenster
 Valley View

Towns
 Oak Ridge
 Road Runner

Census-designated place
 Lake Kiowa

Unincorporated communities

 Bulcher
 Burns City
 Dexter
 Era
 Hood
 Leo
 Lois
 Marysville
 Moss Lake
 Mountain Springs
 Myra
 Prairie Point
 Rosston
 Sivells Bend
 Walnut Bend
 Woodbine

See also

 List of museums in North Texas
 National Register of Historic Places listings in Cooke County, Texas
 Recorded Texas Historic Landmarks in Cooke County
 Cooke County Library

References

External links
 Cooke County government's website
 

 
1849 establishments in Texas
Populated places established in 1849